Heliconius demeter, the Demeter longwing, is a butterfly of the family Nymphalidae. It was described by Otto Staudinger in 1897. It is found in the Northern and Eastern part of the Amazon basin, from Guyana to Northern Brazil and Peru. The habitat consists of sandy rainforests.

The larvae are solitary and feed on Dilkea (Passifloraceae) species. Full-grown larvae have a yellow body with black spots and a black head. They reach a length of about 20 mm.

Adult H. demeter are distinguished morphologically from their sister species Heliconius eratosignis because they have a yellow streak on the base of the forewing costa underside; in contrast, Heliconius eratosignis has a solid orange basal costal margin on the underside of the forewing. Brown & Benson in 1975 recognized these differences but argued that the two forms were subspecies of the same species. They also recorded both Heliconius eratosignis gregarious and H. demeter solitary larvae in their paper. The Tree of Life web project has yet to recognize Heliconius eratosignis as a separate species, but shows an image of a male Heliconius eratosignis from Peru under the description of H. demeter.

Etymology
The species is named after the Greek goddess Demeter.

Subspecies
H. d. demeter Staudinger, 1897 (Peru, Brazil: Amazonas)
H. d. angeli Neukirchen, 1997 (Peru)
H. d. beebei  Turner, 1966 (Guyana)
H. d. bouqueti  Nöldner, 1901 (French Guiana)
H. d. joroni  Lamas & Rosser, 2019 (Peru)
H. d. karinae  Neukirchen, 1990 (Brazil: Pará)
H. d. neildi  Neukirchen, 1997 (Ecuador)
H. d. terrasanta  Brown & Benson, 1975 (Brazil: Pará)
H. d. titan  Neukirchen, 1995 (Brazil: Amazonas)
H. d. turneri  Brown & Benson, 1975 (Brazil: Amazonas)
H. d. zikani  Brown & Benson, 1975 (Brazil: Amazonas)

References

demeter
Nymphalidae of South America
Lepidoptera of Brazil
Lepidoptera of French Guiana
Fauna of the Amazon
Butterflies described in 1897
Taxa named by Otto Staudinger